Star City is a fictional city that appears in stories published by DC Comics, best known as the traditional home of the superheroes known by, or affiliated with, the shared alias of Green Arrow. Beyond that, it is also known to other characters of the DC Universe as both a port city and a haven for artists in many of the media, from print to audio/visual to music. Green Arrow's base of operation was initially New York City. However, during the Silver Age, Green Arrow's home was established as being in Star City, being first mentioned in Adventure Comics #265, before making its first appearance in the following issue. The city has also been called Starling City.

Established history in the comics
According to several published accounts, Star City was incorporated as a city under its current name over 200 years ago.

Before moving on to service in first Metropolis and later Gotham City, Maggie Sawyer began her career as a police officer in Star City.

The first costumed vigilante to serve as mayor was Thomas "Steelclaw" Bolt, who adopted an undercover persona as a costumed criminal as part of his efforts to bring local crime under control. He died in office of that attempt.

During the years that Green Arrow spent outside of Star City, at least one other costumed crime-fighter operated there: Chase Lawler, one of the several known Manhunters.

The final Green Arrow storyline before One Year Later featured Doctor Light and Merlyn detonating explosives, leaving nearly a third of Star City in shambles in what becomes known as the "Amsterdam Avenue Disaster".

In the One Year Later storyline, Oliver Queen becomes the mayor of Star City. News that he had been secretly funding the Outsiders, essentially a bounty hunter team at this point in their history, causes a scandal. Coupled with his marginal popularity with the voting public (he never had more than 50% of the city supporting him while in office), this prompted Queen to resign his position. His resignation carried the stipulation that his successor maintains the various social aid organizations and resources Queen had established. Ollie was able to beat his opponent by resigning prior to the election and putting someone he trusted in charge of the city.

In Justice League: Cry for Justice mini-series, Star City is the scene of a devastating tremor set by Prometheus. Prometheus' plan is to teleport Star City—which he has targeted solely because it is the home city of a member of the Justice League—to an alternate universe. As the plan fails, Star City's outskirts are left mostly intact but there is a vast, star-shaped ruin in the center of the city, and a death toll of ninety-thousand people and rising.

During the events of Brightest Day, Deadman's white power ring teleports him to the site of the tremor, where his newly acquired White Lantern's powers turn the ruin into a lush forest. Shortly after this event, Martian Manhunter is informed by the Entity that he has been resurrected in order to burn the forest to the ground. Martian Manhunter arrives in the Star City forest and attempts to complete his task, however, he is stopped from doing that by the Entity who revealed to him that the forest he is to burn down is on Mars. Green Arrow discovers that the forest appears to have some sentient intelligence or some kind of powers of illusion with instructions to protect or kill someone. The Entity later reveals that Nekron's attack at the Entity not only was mortal to it but also heightened the contamination of the planet, and the corruption will rise up in the form of another "dark avatar" of the darkness who will try to destroy the Star City forest, in which is the key to save Earth's soul and the new champion of life, causing the Earth to die.

Green Arrow later discovers that the forest is not what appeared to be and that the heart of the forest is evil. This evil eventually became the "Dark Avatar" which the Entity mentioned would come to destroy the forest. This Dark Avatar is actually the original Swamp Thing resurrected as a Black Lantern. Also as the entire Earth falls victim to its poisoning and corruption it is revealed that the only place that is not yet touched is the forest where the sky is still blue, however as the population began to take shelter they are stopped by a white barrier. To defend the forest from the Dark Avatar, the Entity summoned the Elementals, which are revealed to be the heroes whose life force had been collected by the Entity and which reflect the simplest essential parts and principles of nature, each one representing one of the four elements, the Entity also reveals that the central tree in the Star City forest is the foundation for the Parliament of Trees. The Elementals are fused with the body of Alec Holland to resurrect him and then the forest fused Alec Holland to transform him into the new Swamp Thing. After the Dark Avatar is finally defeated, Alec Holland reclaims the title of Swamp Thing and begins to restore life in Star City's areas.

Locations through the decades
Star City's location, like those of Metropolis, Gotham City, and other cities in the DC Universe, was uncertain for many years, with varying depictions over the decades. Several golden age stories depicted Green Arrow and Speedy fighting seafaring villains – the Angler, the Harbor Thief, and the Turtle, among others – implying the city was on a sea coast. Long before Green Arrow joined the Justice League of America, he and Speedy often teamed up with underwater adventurer Aquaman (whose adventures, like those of the two archers, appeared in Adventure Comics), supporting the notion that Star City was a coastal city.

Star City's location was given as near the Great Lakes in the 1960s and on the southern coast of New England from the mid-1970s through the mid-1980s. In Detective Comics #470 (June 1977) it was stated that Star City was in Connecticut. In DC Comics Presents #87 (Nov. 1985), Superman is flying above “Earth-Prime” (the real world without superheroes) and notices that Star City has been replaced by Boston, Massachusetts.

A map published in 1985 and occasionally modified by Mayfair Games detailed Star City's geographical layout. Though the Atlas placed Star City on California's Pacific Coast, north of San Francisco, the layout used for the city map resembled the geography of metropolitan Chicago, but reversed, so that it would be on the Michigan side of Lake Michigan. The neighborhood of "East Gary" was approximately where the real Gary, Indiana, would be on the reversed map, but on the Pacific Ocean instead of Lake Michigan.

In Birds of Prey #119 (August 2008), Star City is depicted as being in the San Francisco Bay region, although the published map erroneously substitutes Star City for San Francisco. Also, the city of Platinum Flats (based on Silicon Valley), is described as "half an hour" away.

In the TV show Arrow (2012–’20), Star City is generally described as being on the West Coast, or Western Seaboard, and in dialogue is described as 600 miles from Central City. A season five episode gives the city a Washington state postal code. Near the end of season 5 episode 22, a computer generated map showing the flight path of Chase's plane puts Star City on or near San Francisco as the coastline perfectly matches that of northern California. Season 7 episode 15 has Felicity giving coordinates (which turn out to be for the Glades) of 47.119N, 122.3301W, which actually maps to the south suburbs of Tacoma (about 40 miles south of Seattle). However, in season 3 episode 9, another flight map shown briefly onscreen locates Starling City (changed during the show) in the Great Lakes region.

The DC Rebirth Green Arrow series (2016—) specifically states Star City as actually being Seattle, only later being renamed Star City.

Established city characteristics

Landmarks
Among the more notable landmarks established by various Green Arrow creative teams include the following:
Star BridgeThis suspension bridge is one of city's primary visual landmarks, known for a giant star sculpture atop each tower in the span of the bridge, connecting Star City's various regions.
The Grell MuseumNamed after Mike Grell, who wrote and drew a definitive era of Green Arrow in the 1980s
Papp Stadium Named after George Papp, one of Green Arrow's original co-creators from the 1940s, this is the home of the Star City Rockets baseball team

Neighborhoods
Known neighborhoods include:
The "Triangle" Long fought over by the city's various organized crime factions until the intervention of the freelance criminal Deadshot as depicted in his second mini-series.
Lamb Valley Detailed in the pages of the Green Arrow collected edition Straight Shooter.
The South End Introduced in Green Arrow (vol. 3) #60, in the wake of the events of Infinite Crisis and 52.
The Glades Named in Green Arrow (vol. 3) #61. One of the districts directly abutting the South End.
Orchid Bay The downtown section, and site of City Hall. Named in Green Arrow (vol. 3) #63.
Adams Heights Named in Green Arrow (vol. 3) #67. Possibly named in honor of artist Neal Adams, long associated with Green Arrow.

Statistics
Star City's population is given in Green Arrow ("City Walls" Pt.3) as being roughly five million. The population is given as just under 600,000 in the CW series Arrow. In the third season episode “Guilty”, Felicity mentions there being “roughy 86,000 ‘Paco’s’, give or take a few nick names". This estimates the total population being almost 15% named “Paco”.

Sports teams
The fictional Star City Rockets play baseball in Papp Stadium, while the fictional Star City Thunder play basketball in Tinder-Smith Garden.

In other media

Live-action television

Smallville
Star City was briefly mentioned by Lex Luthor in the Smallville sixth-season episode "Reunion". In "Freak", Tobias Rice—a meteor freak whose exposure to kryptonite rendered him blind while allowing him to "see" other people infected by meteor rocks—is sent to Star City because Oliver Queen said he would be given a cornea transplant. A computer generated panorama of Star City can also be seen in the first episode in the online Smallville spinoff short The Oliver Queen Chronicles. In the Smallville eighth-season episode "Bride", Jimmy Olsen was sent to Star City for medical attention after being critically injured by Doomsday. In the season 10 episode "Fortune", Chloe tells Clark that she is moving to Star City, where she will work by day as a reporter for the Star City Register and nurture new superheroes by night. Star City was also briefly mentioned in the sixth-season episode "Justice" when Oliver Queen was talking to Clark about being on patrol in Star City when he came across Bart Allen, aka "The Flash".

Arrowverse 

In Arrow, Star City is originally named "Starling City" but is renamed in the fourth season as part of the storyline. In the first-season episode "Unfinished Business", the coordinates (47.6097N 122.3331W) place a rundown neighborhood of Starling City in Seattle, near the Pioneer Square-Skid Road Historic District known for the Seattle Underground. This was built after the Great Seattle Fire of 1889 and forgotten decades later, much like the subway system abandoned in Starling City. In the second season episode "Blast Radius", a Starling City ZIP code is shown as 98114. 981xx is the main ZIP Code for Seattle. However, in the episode "The Climb" Starling is shown on a map to be in the Upper Midwest. In the pilot episode of The Flash Oliver Queen states Starling is 600 miles away from Central City, which could be in Missouri (although Central City is traditionally placed at Athens, Ohio). In "Schism", the final episode of the fourth season, an on-screen graphic shows a map of the Midwest with Star City in place of Chicago. Near the end of season five episode "Missing", a computer generated map showing the flight path of Adrian Chase's plane puts Star City on or near San Francisco as the coastline perfectly matches that of northern California.

Multiple cities are used for establishing shots, including Vancouver, Baltimore, Boston, Brussels, Frankfurt, Jersey City, Philadelphia, and Tokyo. Reference is made to an area in Starling City known as the Glades where the criminal element is particularly predominant, similar to the Narrows and Crime Alley in Gotham City. Starling City has also been said to have a baseball team known as the "Starling Rockets" and a "Starling Comets" football team has been seen. Starling City has an aquarium and zoo, both of which were used for minor plot points, the aquarium being used by a Vertigo junkie as a place to hold hostages and the zoo's Tibetan pit vipers were used for their venom by Nyssa al Ghul. Starling City also at one point had a functioning subway system but no longer does. After the city is attacked at the end of the second season by Slade Wilson's mirakuru-enhanced army, in the third season scientist and businessman Ray Palmer proposes to rename the city "Star City" to keep people from remembering the terrorist attacks. It is later renamed Star City in season four as a memorial to Palmer due to his apparent death in the season three finale. In season four, Queen is appointed the mayor of Star City. In the sixth season episode "Thanksgiving", Star City is shown to have its own stadium, "Starling Stadium", where musicians like Billy Joel perform. In season seven's 2040 flashforwards, the Glades has developed into its own thriving city, separated from the poorer Star City with a wall. The wall is destroyed by the Star City vigilantes in the season seven finale.
 Starling City of Earth-2 is mentioned in The Flash's season two episode "Enter Zoom" and Arrow's season five episode "Who Are You?". In 2015, the Starling City vigilante known as the Arrow was revealed to be Robert Queen. In Arrow's season eight premiere, Oliver travels to the Earth-2 Starling City, where Adrian Chase is now operating as the Hood. The city and the entire Earth-2 is destroyed by an anti-matter wave at the end of the episode.
 Star City of Earth-38 is mentioned by Rhea as a future target for a Daxamite attack in Supergirl season two episode "Nevertheless, She Persisted".
 Star City of Earth-X appears in The Flash season four episode "Crisis on Earth-X, Part 3" and Freedom Fighters: The Ray season one "Episode Six". Wishing to fight back against the oppressive New Reich, the Freedom Fighters set up a base of operations in a bunker in Star City. A number of Earth One heroes were brought here by Freedom Fighters Ray Terrill and Leo Snart.

Animation
Star City has also been the setting of several Green Arrow stories on animated series like The Batman, Batman: The Brave and the Bold, DC Showcase: Green Arrow, and Young Justice. Despite not physically appearing in the show, Star City has been mentioned in Beware The Batman.

References

Fictional elements introduced in 1959
Green Arrow
Fictional populated places in California
Fictional populated places in Washington (state)
Washington
DC Comics populated places
1941 in comics

de:DC-Universum#Städte